Dendronotus subramosus is a species of sea slug, a dendronotid nudibranch, a shell-less marine gastropod mollusc in the family Dendronotidae.

Distribution 

This species can be found on the Pacific Ocean coast of North America from Bamfield, Vancouver Island, British Columbia to Islas Coronado, Baja California, Mexico.

Feeding habits
This species feeds on the hydroid Aglaophenia.

References

Dendronotidae
Gastropods described in 1966